Tourkia may refer to:

 Turkey, a country in southeastern Europe and western Asia
The name of Turkey in  modern Greek
The name of the Ottoman Empire in medieval and early modern Greek
 Tourkia (Khazaria) ("eastern Tourkia"), designation for the early medieval Khazar state in Byzantine sources
 Tourkia (Hungary) ("western Tourkia"), designation for the medieval Hungarian state in Byzantine sources

See also
 Name of Turkey
 Turkey (disambiguation)